Rhodtrispa dilaticornis, is a species of leaf beetle native to India, and Sri Lanka.

References 

Cassidinae
Insects of Sri Lanka
Beetles described in 1891